Tzameret Towers, also known as Akirov Towers, are three 34-story residential towers in Tel Aviv, Israel.

History
The first two towers were completed in 2003, and the third  in 2006. The towers were designed by Moore Yaski Sivan Architects. Tower 3 was originally planned as a 140-meter tower containing 140 apartments, but this was scaled down and it was finished to a height almost identical to that of the other towers. The final design contained 120 apartments. This tower topped out in August 2004. The top three floors of Tower 2 contain one of Israel's most expensive apartments, purchased for $10 million, a record-breaking purchase at the time. The total complex contains 360 apartments.

Living in Tzameret Towers became a status symbol, although marketing was accomplished without a sales campaign or public promotion. The building set a  new  standard for residential buildings, with amenities such as fitness centers and swimming pools that were introduced hereafter into all new luxury complexes. The project has been described as a turning point in Tel Aviv's housing culture.

Notable residents
Ehud Barak, former Prime Minister of Israel

See also
List of skyscrapers in Israel
Architecture of Israel

References

External links
Tzameret Tower 1, Tower 2, and Tower 3 at Emporis

Skyscrapers in Tel Aviv
Residential buildings completed in 2003
Residential buildings completed in 2006
Residential skyscrapers in Israel